The 2012 CONCACAF Women's Olympic Qualifying Tournament was an association football competition used to determine the two participants who would compete at the 2012 Summer Olympics. It was held at BC Place in Vancouver, British Columbia, Canada, from January 19–29, 2012.

Qualification

Thirteen teams, eight from the Caribbean and five from Central America, competed to join automatic qualifiers Canada, Mexico and the United States in the eight-team final tournament.

Caribbean qualification took place as two groups of four teams that competed from June 29 to July 9.  Cuba and Haiti qualified from group A with seven points each, and were joined by the Dominican Republic from group B who won their group with nine points.

UNCAF's two slots were determined by a five-team group that competed from September 30 to October 8.  Costa Rica won the group without dropping any points, and were joined by Guatemala who only lost to Costa Rica.

Squads

Group stage
Draw for the group stage was held on October 24, with schedules announced two days later.

The United States' 14–0 victory over the Dominican Republic on January 20 set a tournament record for the largest margin of victory.

Times listed are Pacific Standard Time (PST) – UTC−8.

Group A

Group B

Knockout stage

Bracket

Semi-finals

Final
The Canada versus USA Final set a record for CONCACAF Women's Olympic qualification with 25,427 in attendance, the second time the record was broken this tournament. Previously, the Canada versus Mexico semifinal set the record with 22,954 spectators.

Goalscorers
9 goals
 Christine Sinclair

6 goals
 Carli Lloyd
 Amy Rodriguez
 Abby Wambach

5 goals
 Sydney Leroux

4 goals
 Heather O'Reilly
 Alex Morgan

3 goals

 Wendy Acosta
 Wendy Pineda
 Maribel Dominguez
 Anisa Guajardo

2 goals

 Melissa Tancredi
 Maria Monterroso
 Marylin Diaz
 Jennifer Ruiz
 Lauren Cheney
 Tobin Heath

1 goal

 Christina Julien
 Kaylyn Kyle
 Kelly Parker
 Sophie Schmidt
 Fernanda Barrantes
 Saudy Rosales
 Ana Lucía Martínez
 Kimberly Boulos
 Manoucheka Pierre-Louis
 Nadia Valentin
 Dinora Garza
 Veronica Perez
 Luz del Rosario Saucedo
 Rachel Buehler
 Lori Lindsey
 Megan Rapinoe

Own goal
 Marianne Ugalde (playing against Canada)

See also
Football at the 2012 Summer Olympics – Women's tournament
2012 CONCACAF Men's Olympic Qualifying Tournament

References

External links
2012 CONCACAF Women's Olympic Qualification
Tournament at soccerway.com

 
olympic
CONCACAF Women's Olympic Qualifying Tournament
CON
2012
Qual
Qual
CONCACAF Women's Olympic Qualifying Tournament
CONCACAF Women's Olympic Qualifying Tournament